One of These Nights is a 1975 album by the rock band the Eagles.

One of These Nights may also refer to:

"One of These Nights" (Eagles song), the title song from the album
One of These Nights: Boston 1993, album by singer Don Henley
"One of These Nights" (Red Velvet song), 2016

See also
One of Those Nights (disambiguation)